The 1990 Volvo PGA Championship was the 36th edition of the Volvo PGA Championship, an annual professional golf tournament on the European Tour. It was held 25–28 May at the West Course of Wentworth Club in Virginia Water, Surrey, England, a suburb southwest of London.

It was the first year in which the event was granted "flagship event" status of the European Tour by the Official World Golf Ranking.

The event was won by Mike Harwood, beating John Bland and Nick Faldo by one shot. It was his first Volvo PGA Championship win.

Round summaries

First round 
Friday, 25 May 1990

Second round 
Saturday, 26 May 1990

Third round 
Sunday, 27 May 1990

Final round 
Monday, 28 May 1990

References 

BMW PGA Championship
Golf tournaments in England
Volvo PGA Championship
Volvo PGA Championship
Volvo PGA Championship